Michael Kelly Finnigan (April 26, 1945 – August 11, 2021) was an American keyboard player and vocalist, his speciality being the B3 Hammond organ.  Working primarily as a freelance studio musician and touring player, he played with a wide variety of musicians in pop, rock, blues and jazz.

Life and career
Finnigan was born in Troy, Ohio, and attended the University of Kansas on a basketball scholarship.

Finnigan toured with and sessioned for Jimi Hendrix, Joe Cocker, Etta James, Sam Moore, Crosby Stills and Nash, Dave Mason, Buddy Guy, The Manhattan Transfer, Taj Mahal, Michael McDonald, Maria Muldaur, Peter Frampton, Cher, Ringo Starr, Leonard Cohen, Tower of Power, Rod Stewart, David Coverdale, Tracy Chapman, Los Lonely Boys, and Bonnie Raitt.

Finnigan recorded Early Bird Cafe with the Serfs in the late 1960s, with Tom Wilson producing. The Serfs were the house band at a nightclub in Wichita, Kansas at the time. He then toured and cut an album with Jerry Hahn, The Jerry Hahn Brotherhood released in 1970. He recorded two solo records in the 1970s, one with Jerry Wood. He later collaborated with two other Columbia artists, Les Dudek and Jim Krueger, with whom he formed the DFK Band (Dudek, Finnigan, and Krueger) in 1978. Subsequently, his work featured on a CD by the Finnigan Brothers (NashFilms Records), a collaboration with his younger brother Sean and founding member of Bread, Robb Royer.

Finnigan was twice a winner of a Blues Music Award (formerly W.C. Handy Award) for his work with Taj Mahal as a member of the Phantom Blues Band. He was always active politically and was, for several years, a regular contributor to the weblog Crooks and Liars. In 2013 and 2014, he was nominated for a Blues Music Award in the 'Pinetop Perkins Piano Player' category.

Personal life
He was married for 50 years to Candy Finnigan, an intervention counselor who appeared on the television show Intervention. They have two children: a daughter, Bridget, and a son, Kelly. Finnigan was an active blogger, with a fondness for liberal/progressive causes and commentary.

Death
Finnigan died from liver cancer on August 11, 2021, in Los Angeles at the age of 76.

Partial discography
 1969: The Serfs – The Early Bird Cafe, Capitol Records
 1968: Jimi Hendrix – Electric Ladyland
 1970: Jerry Hahn – The Jerry Hahn Brotherhood
 1971: Tommy Bolin – Whirlwind
 1971: Big Brother and the Holding Company – How Hard It Is
 1972: Finnigan and Wood – Crazed Hipsters
 1974: Dave Mason – Dave Mason 
 1976: Mike Finnigan – Mike Finnigan, Warner Bros. Records
 1977: Peter Frampton – I'm in You
 1977: Dave Mason – Let It Flow
 1978: Ben Sidran – A Little Kiss in the Night
 1978: Les Dudek – Ghost Town Parade
 1978: Mike Finnigan – Black & White, Columbia Records
 1978: Jim Krueger – Sweet Salvation
 1979: The Dudek Finnigan Krueger Band – Special Tour Sampler
 1980: Cher – Black Rose
 1982: Crosby, Stills & Nash – Daylight Again
 1983: Crosby, Stills & Nash – Allies
 1984: Stephen Stills – Right By You
 1988: Crosby, Stills & Nash & Young – American Dream
 1993: I Mother Earth – Dig
 1993: Buddy Guy – Feels Like Rain
 1994: Crosby, Stills & Nash – After the Storm
 2000: Tracy Chapman – Telling Stories
 2000: David Coverdale – Into the Light
 2004: The Mooney Suzuki – Alive & Amplified
 2005: Taj Mahal – Taj Mahal & the Phantom Blues Band: Live in St. Lucia
 2006: The Phantom Blues Band – Out of the Shadows
 2006: Keb' Mo' – Suitcase
 2007: Zen Blues Quartet – Again and Yet Again
 2007: Joe Cocker – Hymn for My Soul
 2007: The Phantom Blues Band – Footprints
 2008: The Eclectic Beast Band – Living the Music
 2010: Various Artists: The Imus Ranch Record II – "Part Time Love" (with the Phantom Blues Band)
 2010: Mike Finnigan – Mike Finnigan [reissue], Wounded Bird Records
 2010: Willie Basse – Break Away
 2011: Finnigan and Wood – It's Only a Rock and Roll Show (recorded 1971, previously unreleased)
 2011: Trampled Under Foot – Wrong Side of the Blues
 2011: The Phantom Blues Band – Inside Out
 2012: Bonnie Raitt – Slipstream
 2013: Eric Burdon – 'Til Your River Runs Dry
 2013: Kara Grainger – Shiver & Sigh
 2014: Trampled Under Foot – Badlands
 2014: Dave Mason – Future's Past
 2014: Hilary Scott – Freight Train Love
 2016: Annika Chambers – Wild & Free
 2017: Danielle Nicole – Cry No More, Concord Records
 2018: Jay-Bee & the Ultratone Allstars – Life Ain't Got No Shortcuts
 2020: The Phantom Blues Band – Still Cookin'

References

External links
Official Site for Finnigan and Wood
Official Site for The Phantom Blues Band
Mike Finnigan Interview NAMM Oral History Library (2017)
 
 

1945 births
2021 deaths
20th-century American keyboardists
American male organists
American blues pianists
American male pianists
People from Troy, Ohio
20th-century American pianists
21st-century American keyboardists
21st-century American pianists
21st-century organists
20th-century American male musicians
21st-century American male musicians
Big Brother and the Holding Company members
Deaths from kidney cancer
Blue Thumb Records artists
American organists